Hurry Home, Candy  by Meindert DeJong is a children's novel about a dog. Illustrated by Maurice Sendak, the book was first published in 1953 and was a Newbery Honor recipient in 1954. It regularly appears on public library and school reading lists.

Plot summary
Hurry Home, Candy tells the story of a young dog named Candy, chronicling his life through several traumatic and joyful events. Told from the dog's perspective, the reader experiences Candy's separation from his mother and being brought to a cold kitchen floor with the ever-present threat of being hit with a broom. Later in the story, Candy becomes a beloved pet to two small children, only to later become separated from them. His quest to survive and be re-united with his new family constitutes the rest of the narrative.

Reception
Kirkus Reviews said "we are those things with him, quite stricken with his near tragedy and overjoyed when he finds happiness at last."

References

1953 American novels
1953 children's books
American children's novels
Newbery Honor-winning works
Novels by Meindert DeJong
Books illustrated by Maurice Sendak
Children's novels about animals
Dogs in literature
Harper & Row books